Elections to the French National Assembly were held in Senegal on 10 November 1946 as part of the wider French elections. Two members were elected from the territory, both of which were won by the French Section of the Workers International. The seats were taken by Lamine Guèye and Léopold Sédar Senghor, who had also won the seats in the June elections.

Results

References

1946 in Senegal
1946 11
Senegal
Senegal